The Aguapey River (Spanish Río Aguapey) is a river of Argentina. It is a tributary of the Uruguay River.

See also
List of rivers of Argentina

References

 Rand McNally, The New International Atlas, 1993.

Rivers of Argentina
Rivers of Corrientes Province